Miyar zogale is an hausa dish also known as morninga soup. It is made with moringa leaf as the main ingredient, others include groundnut paste, grounded tomato,beef, cubes, daddawa and palm oil.

Groundnut paste is to thickened the soup and ddadawa (locust beans) is added for taste.

Overview 
Beef and moringa leaf is parboiled in a separate pot. Palm is poured into a pot with grounded tomato,daddawa,cubes and salt stirred for a few minutes, groundnut paste is added gradually to thickened  the soup. When the oil float to the top of the soup, the parboiled moringa leaf is added .

Other foods 
Miyar zogale goes well with biskin masara, wheat,semovita, pounded yam and tuwo shinkafa.

See also 
onGACIOUS

Hausa cuisine

References 

Nigerian cuisine
Hausa cuisine